My Favorite Murder is an American true crime comedy podcast hosted by Karen Kilgariff and Georgia Hardstark. Kilgariff and Hardstark have been performing My Favorite Murder Live shows since September 24, 2016.

List

See also
 List of My Favorite Murder episodes

References

External links
 Episodes on the podcasts official website

My Favorite Murder